Mitchell Ryan Beeney (born 3 October 1995) is an English professional footballer who plays as a goalkeeper for Concord Rangers.

Club career

Chelsea
In 2007, Beeney joined Chelsea's academy from Gillingham, along with his brother Jordan. After becoming a key member of Chelsea's under-18 squad, Beeney was promoted up to the under-21 squad. On 10 May 2015, he was named on the bench to face Liverpool, remaining unused in the 1–1 draw at Stamford Bridge.

Loan to Newport County
On 15 January 2016, Beeney joined League Two side Newport County on a one-month loan deal. The next day, he made his professional debut in a 1–0 victory over York City at Bootham Crescent, therefore earning a clean sheet. The loan period was extended on 18 February, to 16 April. However, on 25 February 2016 Beeney was released from his loan by Newport manager Warren Feeney.

Loan to Crawley Town
On 23 June 2016, it was announced that Beeney would be joining League Two side Crawley Town until January 2017. On 20 July 2016, it was announced that Beeney would wear the number one jersey ahead of Crawley Town's 2016–17 campaign. Then later on he signed a one-year extension at Chelsea. On 30 August 2016, Beeney was given his first start in an EFL Trophy tie against Colchester United, after being used as a back-up to Yusuf Mersin. The game resulted in a 1–0 victory for the Reds, with James Collins scoring the only goal. On 10 September 2016, Beeney made his league debut in a 2–1 away defeat against Stevenage.

Loan to Sligo Rovers
On 22 February 2018, Beeney was announced as having signed on loan for Sligo Rovers of the League of Ireland until 30 June 2018. A day later, he made his debut during their 2–1 home victory over Derry City, playing the full 90 minutes as Sligo Rovers claimed their first three points of the season.

Sligo Rovers
After being released by Chelsea, Beeney re-signed for Rovers on a permanent deal.

Non-league
Beeney signed for National League side Hartlepool on a short-term contract on 7 December 2019. He went on to make six league appearances before being released at the end of the 2019–20 season. Following his departure from Pools, Beeney signed for Cheshunt.

In the 2021–22 season, Beeney made 36 league appearances for Bowers & Pitsea.

On June 17, 2022, it was announced that he had signed for Isthmian League Premier Division side Horsham.

On 31 October 2022, Beeney signed for Concord Rangers.

Personal life
He is the son of Mark Beeney.  His brother, Jordan, previously played for Charlton Athletic.

Career statistics

References

External links
 
 
 England profile at The Football Association

1995 births
Living people
Footballers from Leeds
English footballers
Association football goalkeepers
Chelsea F.C. players
Newport County A.F.C. players
Crawley Town F.C. players
Sligo Rovers F.C. players
Hartlepool United F.C. players
Cheshunt F.C. players
Bowers & Pitsea F.C. players
Horsham F.C. players
Concord Rangers F.C. players
English Football League players
League of Ireland players
England youth international footballers